FC Podillya Khmelnytskyi is a professional Ukrainian football team that is based in Khmelnytskyi, Khmelnytskyi Oblast, Ukraine. The club competes in the Ukrainian Second League.

History

Soviet era
Established in the Soviet Union as part of the Dynamo sports society in 1926 as Dynamo Proskurov (Proskuriv), the club participated mostly in championships of the city and its region. In 1940 and 1941, it represented the region in the republican competitions among the sports societies of Ukraine. During World War II, the Soviet sports competitions were suspended and the club was disbanded.

After the World War II, Podillya once again started out as a subsection of the Soviet Dynamo athletic franchise in 1948, under the name of Dynamo, of course. In 1951, it entered all Ukrainian republican football competitions. In 1960, the club obtained the status of "team of master" and entered the Soviet Class B competitions. That year is considered to be the year of establishment. In 1978, the team was renamed after the historical Ukrainian region of Podillya (Podoliya in Russian) where it played its home games.

Ukraine
After Ukraine gained independence in 1991, Podillya was placed in the Ukrainian First League in the very first season. Podillya finished the year in fourth place out of fourteen teams under the management of Hrynevych.

It was renamed as Nord-Am Ltd.- Podillya in the 1993 season after its sponsor, Nord-Am Ltd (stands for Northern America). During that season, Podillya hired Yuriy Avanesov as its manager. Until club's relegation in 1998 to the Druha Liha, the team was placing inconsistently in the middle of the tournament table. As a result of the relegation, Avanesov was fired and replaced by Kvartsyaniy. He managed the team until September 1997. The team finished the first half of the next season in second place after the return of Avanesov. The year that he returned the team finished first in the Druha Liha and was promoted to  the Persha Liha again. They started the 1998–99 season in the Persha Liha however they finished in 16th out of 20 and were relegated again.

They started the 1999–2000 season in Druha Liha A and finished in 2nd place, one stop away from promotion. The 2000–01 season was another year in the Ukrainian Second League where they finished in 6th place in Druha Liha B. The 2001–02 season was another shortcoming season for Podillya when they finished in 3rd with 27 wins, but still one spot away from promotion. Podillya finished the 2002–03 season in 3rd place in Druha Liha A. The 2003–04 season was another 2nd-place finish in Druha Liha A, but still one spot away from promotion.

Merger with Krasyliv

Podillya started the 2004–05 season in the Ukrainian First League after finishing second the year before. Despite not being in position for promotion, Podillya merged with the FC Obolon Kyiv farm team FC Krasyliv-Obolon under a new name of FC Podillya Khmelnytskyi. The Krasyliv's team existed since 2000 and soon after being promoted in 2002 to the Ukrainian First League merged with FC Obolon Kyiv.

In 2004, after the merger FC Krasyliv with FC Podillya Khmelnytskyi, the club was renamed as AFC Podillya Khmelnytskyi. The newly formed club kept Podillya's name and became independent from Obolon. They play at Podillya Stadium which has 10,000 seats. Players lived in Krasyliv.

2007 crisis and creation of Dynamo
In 2006–2007, a scandal arose between the club's owner, Petro Arsenyuk, and the mayor of Khmelnytskyi, Serhiy Melnyk, following mayoral elections. In 2007, the professional club playing in the Ukrainian First League moved their home games to Krasyliv. At the same time, due to the efforts of Stanislav Ostrovskyi and the Khmelnytskyi city authorities, another club, FC Podillya Khmelnytskyi, entered national amateur competition, the 2007 Ukrainian Football Amateur League, as well as Khmelnytskyi Oblast football competitions. Following the first stage of national amateur competitions, the newly formed communal club applied for a place in the Second League. Meawhile, the Podillya club playing in Krasyliv was relegated and was therefore expected to play in the 2007–08 Ukrainian Second League.

In the end, the Khmelnytskyi Podillya prevailed, while the Krasyliv Podillya withdrew. The new club, under manager Bohdan Blavatskyi, finished third in the 2007–08 Ukrainian Second League season. The following season the club with new manager did not perform well.

During the winter break of the 2008–09 Ukrainian Second League season, the Khmelnytskyi Oblast government withdrew from sponsoring of the team by dissolving the club and the club's senior team was further sponsored by the Khmelnytskyi regional Dynamo sports society which organized FC Dynamo Khmelnytskyi that took over the football team. The club's succession was approved early in March 2009 by the Professional Football League of Ukraine. Parallelly to Dynamo at regional competitions continued to participate Podillia. In 2007, 2008, 2010 and 2011, "Podillya" took part in the Khmelnytskyi Oblast football championships. In 2013 in the Khmelnytskyi Oblast championship it played under name "Podillya-Olimp". At the end of 2013 during the ongoing 2013–14 Ukrainian Second League season, the Dynamo administration announced in official letter to the Professional Football League of Ukraine that FC Dynamo Khmelnytskyi which was established in 2007 has ceased to exist.

Latest reorganization and restart
In 2014 ,Podillya entered national competitions among amateurs.

Hetman Khmelnytskyi
In 2015, a phantom club FC Hetman Khemlnytskyi took part in 2015 Ukrainian Amateur Cup.

Since 2016
The club will be competing in the 2016–17 Ukrainian Second League.

In 2020, the president of Podillya, Yevhen Beiderman, ran for the post of the PFL president.

In July 2022, Club  announced that it will not be able to participate in the new season of the Ukrainian First League.

Team names

    1926–1975: Dynamo (under auspices of the Dynamo regional society, see Dynamo (Ukraine))
    1975–1978: Khvylya (under auspices of the Trade Union regional society)
    1978–1993: Podoliya (under auspices of the Avanhard regional society, see Avanhard (sports society))
    1993–1994: Nord-Am – Podillya
    1994–2004: Podillya (city team)
    2004–2007: AFC Podillya (merger with FC Krasyliv, owned by Arsenyuk-Shtefanik)
    2007–2009: Podillya-Khmelnytskyi (communal enterprise)
    2009–2013: Dynamo Khmelnytskyi (under auspices of the Dynamo regional society, see Dynamo (Ukraine))
    2013: Podillya-Olimp
    2014 onwards: Podillya (city team)

Stadium

Podillya Khmelnytskyi play at the Sport Complex Podillya (the venue at the complex is named Podillya Stadium; ; Sportyvnyĭ kompleks "Podillya"), a sports facility in Khmelnytskyi. The stadium has a capacity of 10,500 people, however the club's website lists the capacity at only 6,800.

Podillya Stadium opened in 1960. FC Temp Shepetivka won the 1991 Football Cup of the Ukrainian SSR at the stadium.

The stadium also hosts rugby matches, including a 2015 European Nations Cup international match.

Renovation
Reconstruction of the stadium started in 2012 and stopped and started until a grant worth ₴4 million was given in 2015 to complete the works.

The football team had to move out of the stadium during reconstruction works but eventually returned before the stadium had been finished. The renovations to the stadium added a six-lane running track so the stadium can host athletic events.

The sports complex also contains an electrical substation.

Honors
 Soviet Second League
 Runners-up (1): 1966
Ukrainian Second League
Winners (2): 1997–98 (Group A), 2020–21 (Group A)
Runners-up (3): 1999–00 (Group A), 2003–04 (Group A)
 Khmelnytskyi Oblast Football Championship
Winners (2): 1953, 2010

Players

Out on loan

League and cup history

Soviet Union (Ukrainian SSR)
{|class="wikitable"
|-bgcolor="#efefef"
! Season
! Div.
! Pos.
! Pl.
! W
! D
! L
! GS
! GA
! P
!
!colspan=2|Soviet Cup
!Notes
|-
|align=center colspan=14|Dinamo / Dynamo
|-
|align=center rowspan=2|1960
|align=center|2nd 
|align=center|17
|align=center|32
|align=center|3
|align=center|8
|align=center|21
|align=center|18
|align=center|64
|align=center|14
|align=center rowspan=2|
|align=center rowspan=2|
|align=center rowspan=2|
|align=center|Relegation play-off
|-
|align=center|2nd 
|align=center|
|align=center|2
|align=center|1
|align=center|0
|align=center|1
|align=center|5
|align=center|4
|align=center|2
|align=center|Won over FC Avanhard Kamianets-Podilskyi
|-
|align=center rowspan=3|1961
|align=center|2nd 
|align=center|8
|align=center|34
|align=center|13
|align=center|7
|align=center|14
|align=center|47
|align=center|45
|align=center|33
|align=center rowspan=3|
|align=center rowspan=3|
|align=center rowspan=3|
|align=center|15th place play-off
|-
|align=center|2nd 
|align=center|16
|align=center|2
|align=center|0
|align=center|1
|align=center|1
|align=center|3
|align=center|5
|align=center|1
|align=center|Lost to SKF Sevastopol
|-
|align=center|2nd 
|align=center|
|align=center|2
|align=center|1
|align=center|0
|align=center|1
|align=center|3
|align=center|1
|align=center|2
|align=center|Won over FC Avanhard Kamianets-Podilskyi
|-
|align=center rowspan=3|1962
|align=center|2nd 
|align=center|9
|align=center|24
|align=center|6
|align=center|10
|align=center|8
|align=center|31
|align=center|36
|align=center|22
|align=center rowspan=3|
|align=center rowspan=3|
|align=center rowspan=3|
|align=center|18-28th places play-off
|-
|align=center|2nd 
|align=center|19
|align=center|10
|align=center|6
|align=center|2
|align=center|2
|align=center|16
|align=center|11
|align=center|14
|align=center|Relegated
|-
|align=center|2nd 
|align=center|
|align=center|2
|align=center|2
|align=center|0
|align=center|0
|align=center|7
|align=center|1
|align=center|4
|align=center|Won over FC Avanhard Kamianets-Podilskyi
|-
|align=center rowspan=2|1963
|align=center|3rd 
|align=center|9
|align=center|38
|align=center|14
|align=center|9
|align=center|15
|align=center|41
|align=center|47
|align=center|37
|align=center rowspan=2|
|align=center rowspan=2|
|align=center rowspan=2|
|align=center|17th place play-off
|-
|align=center|3rd 
|align=center|17
|align=center|2
|align=center|1
|align=center|0
|align=center|1
|align=center|5
|align=center|2
|align=center|2
|align=center|Won over FC Kolhospnyk Poltava
|-
|align=center rowspan=2|1964
|align=center|3rd 
|align=center|7
|align=center|30
|align=center|12
|align=center|8
|align=center|10
|align=center|35
|align=center|22
|align=center|32
|align=center rowspan=2|
|align=center rowspan=2|
|align=center rowspan=2|
|align=center|13–18th places play-off
|-
|align=center|3rd 
|align=center|13
|align=center|10
|align=center|5
|align=center|2
|align=center|3
|align=center|14
|align=center|10
|align=center|12
|align=center|
|-
|align=center rowspan=2|1965
|align=center|3rd 
|align=center|4
|align=center|30
|align=center|14
|align=center|9
|align=center|7
|align=center|40
|align=center|26
|align=center|37
|align=center rowspan=2|
|align=center rowspan=2|
|align=center rowspan=2|
|align=center|7–12th places play-off
|-
|align=center|3rd  
|align=center|10
|align=center|10
|align=center|3
|align=center|2
|align=center|5
|align=center|13
|align=center|15
|align=center|8
|align=center|
|-
|align=center rowspan=2|1966
|align=center|3rd 
|align=center|1
|align=center|38
|align=center|24
|align=center|6
|align=center|8
|align=center|62
|align=center|26
|align=center|54
|align=center rowspan=2|
|align=center rowspan=2|
|align=center rowspan=2|
|align=center|1st place play-off
|-
|align=center|3rd  
|align=center|2
|align=center|2
|align=center|0
|align=center|2
|align=center|0
|align=center|1
|align=center|1
|align=center|2
|align=center|Lost to FC Avanhard Zhovti Vody
|-
|align=center|1967
|align=center|3rd 
|align=center|9
|align=center|40
|align=center|13
|align=center|17
|align=center|10
|align=center|40
|align=center|31
|align=center|43
|align=center|
|align=center|
|align=center|
|align=center|
|-
|align=center rowspan=2|1968
|align=center|3rd 
|align=center|3
|align=center|42
|align=center|21
|align=center|12
|align=center|9
|align=center|59
|align=center|19
|align=center|54
|align=center rowspan=2|
|align=center rowspan=2|
|align=center rowspan=2|
|align=center|Qualified for finals
|-
|align=center|3rd  
|align=center|5
|align=center|7
|align=center|3
|align=center|1
|align=center|3
|align=center|8
|align=center|7
|align=center|7
|align=center|Promoted
|-
|align=center|1969
|align=center|2nd 
|align=center|21
|align=center|42
|align=center|9
|align=center|16
|align=center|17
|align=center|32
|align=center|47
|align=center|34
|align=center|
|align=center|
|align=center|
|align=center|Relegated
|-
|align=center|1970
|align=center|3rd 
|align=center|4
|align=center|40
|align=center|19
|align=center|13
|align=center|8
|align=center|49
|align=center|24
|align=center|51
|align=center|
|align=center|
|align=center|
|align=center|Promoted
|-
|align=center|1971
|align=center|3rd
|align=center|18
|align=center|50
|align=center|15
|align=center|16
|align=center|19
|align=center|35
|align=center|45
|align=center|46
|align=center|
|align=center|
|align=center|
|align=center|
|-
|align=center|1972
|align=center|3rd
|align=center|6
|align=center|46
|align=center|18
|align=center|18
|align=center|10
|align=center|56
|align=center|39
|align=center|54
|align=center|
|align=center|
|align=center|
|align=center|
|-
|align=center|1973
|align=center|3rd
|align=center|9
|align=center|44
|align=center|18
|align=center|5-10
|align=center|11
|align=center|57
|align=center|45
|align=center|41
|align=center|
|align=center|
|align=center|
|align=center|Draws were earned by penalty shootout
|-
|align=center|1974
|align=center|3rd
|align=center|14
|align=center|38
|align=center|11
|align=center|14
|align=center|13
|align=center|32
|align=center|38
|align=center|36
|align=center|
|align=center|
|align=center|
|align=center|
|-
|align=center colspan=14|Khvylya
|-
|align=center|1975
|align=center|3rd
|align=center|7
|align=center|32
|align=center|11
|align=center|12
|align=center|9
|align=center|32
|align=center|25
|align=center|34
|align=center|
|align=center|
|align=center|
|align=center|
|-
|align=center|1976
|align=center|3rd
|align=center|10
|align=center|38
|align=center|14
|align=center|8
|align=center|16
|align=center|34
|align=center|34
|align=center|36
|align=center|
|align=center|
|align=center|
|align=center|
|-
|align=center|1977
|align=center|3rd
|align=center|16
|align=center|44
|align=center|10
|align=center|15
|align=center|19
|align=center|33
|align=center|50
|align=center|35
|align=center|
|align=center|
|align=center|
|align=center|
|-
|align=center colspan=14|Podolia / Podillia
|-
|align=center|1978
|align=center|3rd
|align=center|19
|align=center|44
|align=center|12
|align=center|9
|align=center|23
|align=center|28
|align=center|56
|align=center|33
|align=center|
|align=center|
|align=center|
|align=center|
|-
|align=center|1979
|align=center|3rd
|align=center|13
|align=center|46
|align=center|17
|align=center|8
|align=center|21
|align=center|44
|align=center|57
|align=center|42
|align=center|
|align=center|
|align=center|
|align=center|
|-
|align=center|1980
|align=center|3rd
|align=center|16
|align=center|44
|align=center|13
|align=center|9
|align=center|22
|align=center|32
|align=center|64
|align=center|35
|align=center|
|align=center|
|align=center|
|align=center|
|-
|align=center|1981
|align=center|3rd
|align=center|14
|align=center|44
|align=center|15
|align=center|9
|align=center|20
|align=center|45
|align=center|64
|align=center|39
|align=center|
|align=center|
|align=center|
|align=center|
|-
|align=center|1982
|align=center|3rd
|align=center|20
|align=center|46
|align=center|12
|align=center|12
|align=center|22
|align=center|37
|align=center|62
|align=center|36
|align=center|
|align=center|
|align=center|
|align=center|
|-
|align=center|1983
|align=center|3rd
|align=center|15
|align=center|50
|align=center|18
|align=center|10
|align=center|22
|align=center|56
|align=center|67
|align=center|46
|align=center|
|align=center|
|align=center|
|align=center|
|-
|align=center|1984
|align=center|3rd
|align=center|19
|align=center|38
|align=center|13
|align=center|6
|align=center|19
|align=center|52
|align=center|57
|align=center|32
|align=center|
|align=center|
|align=center|
|align=center|two stages
|-
|align=center|1985
|align=center|3rd
|align=center|22
|align=center|40
|align=center|14
|align=center|9
|align=center|17
|align=center|35
|align=center|42
|align=center|37
|align=center|
|align=center|
|align=center|
|align=center|two stages
|-
|align=center|1986
|align=center|3rd
|align=center|8
|align=center|40
|align=center|16
|align=center|11
|align=center|13
|align=center|64
|align=center|50
|align=center|43
|align=center|
|align=center|
|align=center|
|align=center|two stages
|-
|align=center|1987
|align=center|3rd
|align=center|7
|align=center|52
|align=center|23
|align=center|17
|align=center|12
|align=center|67
|align=center|49
|align=center|63
|align=center|
|align=center|
|align=center|
|align=center|
|-
|align=center|1988
|align=center|3rd
|align=center|5
|align=center|50
|align=center|23
|align=center|13
|align=center|14
|align=center|71
|align=center|51
|align=center|59
|align=center|
|align=center|
|align=center|
|align=center|
|-
|align=center|1989
|align=center|3rd
|align=center|11
|align=center|52
|align=center|24
|align=center|7
|align=center|21
|align=center|64
|align=center|57
|align=center|55
|align=center|
|align=center|
|align=center|
|align=center|Relegated to the lower 2nd League
|-
|align=center|1990
|align=center|3rd (lower)
|align=center|14
|align=center|36
|align=center|10
|align=center|10
|align=center|16
|align=center|37
|align=center|46
|align=center|30
|align=center|
|align=center|
|align=center|
|align=center|
|-
|align=center|1991
|align=center|3rd (lower)
|align=center|14
|align=center|50
|align=center|18
|align=center|13
|align=center|19
|align=center|54
|align=center|55
|align=center|49
|align=center|
|align=center|
|align=center|
|align=center|transitioned to the Ukrainian First League
|}

Ukraine
{|class="wikitable"
|-bgcolor="#efefef"
! Season
! Div.
! Pos.
! Pl.
! W
! D
! L
! GS
! GA
! P
!Domestic Cup
!colspan=2|Europe
!Notes
|-
|align=center colspan=14|Podillia
|-bgcolor=LightCyan
|align=center|1992
|align=center|2nd "A"
|align=center|4
|align=center|26
|align=center|10
|align=center|10
|align=center|6
|align=center|29
|align=center|21
|align=center|30
| align="center" | finals
|align=center|
|align=center|
|align=center|
|-bgcolor=LightCyan
|align=center|1992–93
|align=center|2nd
|align=center|8
|align=center|42
|align=center|15
|align=center|16
|align=center|11
|align=center|45
|align=center|39
|align=center|46
| align="center" | finals
|align=center|
|align=center|
|align=center|as Nord-AM-Podillya
|-bgcolor=LightCyan
|align=center|1993–94
|align=center|2nd
|align=center|11
|align=center|38
|align=center|13
|align=center|9
|align=center|16
|align=center|45
|align=center|47
|align=center|35
| align="center" | finals
|align=center|
|align=center|
|align=center|as Nord-AM-Podillya
|-bgcolor=LightCyan
|align=center|1994–95
|align=center|2nd
|align=center|6
|align=center|42
|align=center|20
|align=center|11
|align=center|11
|align=center|48
|align=center|30
|align=center|71
| align="center" | finals
|align=center|
|align=center|
|align=center|
|-bgcolor=LightCyan
|align=center|1995–96
|align=center|2nd
|align=center|12
|align=center|42
|align=center|18
|align=center|8
|align=center|16
|align=center|55
|align=center|42
|align=center|62
| align="center" | finals
|align=center|
|align=center|
|align=center|
|-bgcolor=LightCyan
|align=center|1996–97
|align=center|2nd
|align=center|22
|align=center|46
|align=center|11
|align=center|13
|align=center|22
|align=center|40
|align=center|66
|align=center|46
| align="center" | finals Second stage
|align=center|
|align=center|
|align=center bgcolor=red|Relegated
|-bgcolor=PowderBlue
|align=center|1997–98
|align=center|3rd "A"
|align=center bgcolor=gold|1
|align=center|34
|align=center|25
|align=center|3
|align=center|6
|align=center|69
|align=center|20
|align=center|78
| align="center" | finals
|align=center|
|align=center|
|align=center bgcolor=green|Promoted
|-bgcolor=LightCyan
|align=center|1998–99
|align=center|2nd
|align=center|16
|align=center|38
|align=center|13
|align=center|12
|align=center|13
|align=center|39
|align=center|42
|align=center|51
| align="center" | finals
|align=center|
|align=center|
|align=center bgcolor=red|Relegated
|-bgcolor=PowderBlue
|align=center|1999-00
|align=center|3rd "A"
|align=center bgcolor=silver|2
|align=center|30
|align=center|21
|align=center|5
|align=center|4
|align=center|67
|align=center|27
|align=center|68
|align=center| final Second League Cup
|align=center|
|align=center|
|align=center|
|-bgcolor=PowderBlue
|align=center|2000–01
|align=center|3rd "B"
|align=center|6
|align=center|28
|align=center|15
|align=center|2
|align=center|11
|align=center|37
|align=center|28
|align=center|47
|align=center|Did not enter
|align=center|
|align=center|
|align=center|
|-bgcolor=PowderBlue
|align=center|2001–02
|align=center|3rd "A"
|align=center|9
|align=center|36
|align=center|14
|align=center|11
|align=center|11
|align=center|38
|align=center|31
|align=center|53
| align="center" | finals
|align=center|
|align=center|
|align=center|
|-bgcolor=PowderBlue
|align=center|2002–03
|align=center|3rd "A"
|align=center bgcolor=tan|3
|align=center|36
|align=center|27
|align=center|2
|align=center|7
|align=center|79
|align=center|31
|align=center|83
|align=center|1st Round
|align=center|
|align=center|
|align=center|
|-bgcolor=PowderBlue
|align=center|2003–04
|align=center|3rd "A"
|align=center bgcolor=silver|2
|align=center|30
|align=center|17
|align=center|8
|align=center|5
|align=center|47
|align=center|20
|align=center|59
| align="center" | finals
|align=center|
|align=center|
|align=center bgcolor=pink|merged with FC Krasyliv
|-
|align=center|2004–06
|align=center colspan=13|Club competes in the Oblast League.
|-bgcolor=SteelBlue
|align=center|2007
|align=center|4th
|align=center bgcolor=silver|2
|align=center|8
|align=center|5
|align=center|1
|align=center|2
|align=center|21
|align=center|6
|align=center|16
|align=center|
|align=center|
|align=center|
|align=center| obtained professional status
|-bgcolor=PowderBlue
|align=center|2007–08
|align=center|3rd
|align=center bgcolor=tan|3
|align=center|30
|align=center|17
|align=center|7
|align=center|6
|align=center|47
|align=center|28
|align=center|58
| align="center" | finals
|align=center|
|align=center|
|align=center| 
|-bgcolor=PowderBlue
|align=center|2008–09
|align=center|3rd
|align=center|8
|align=center|32
|align=center|14
|align=center|5
|align=center|13
|align=center|32
|align=center|38
|align=center|47
| align="center" | finals
|align=center|
|align=center|
|align=center|in winter break replaced with FC Dynamo Khmelnytskyi
|-
|align=center|2010–16
|align=center colspan=13|Club competes in the Oblast League.
|-bgcolor=SteelBlue
|align=center|2014
|align=center|4th
|align=center|5
|align=center|8
|align=center|0
|align=center|2
|align=center|6
|align=center|4
|align=center|18
|align=center|2
|align=center|
|align=center|
|align=center|
|align=center|
|-bgcolor=SteelBlue
|align=center|2016
|align=center|4th
|align=center|4
|align=center|6 	
|align=center|1 	
|align=center|1 	
|align=center|4 	
|align=center|4 	
|align=center|15 	
|align=center|4
|align=center|
|align=center|
|align=center|
|align=center|obtained professional status
|-bgcolor=PowderBlue
|align=center|2016–17
|align=center|3rd
|align=center|14/17
|align=center|32 		 	
|align=center|7 	
|align=center|4 	
|align=center|21 	 	
|align=center|29 	
|align=center|68 	 	 		
|align=center|25
| align="center" | finals
|align=center|
|align=center|
|align=center|
|-bgcolor=PowderBlue
|align=center|2017–18
|align=center|3rd "A"
|align=center|9/10
|align=center|27 		 	
|align=center|6 	
|align=center|4 	
|align=center|17 	 	
|align=center|20 	
|align=center|44 	 	 		
|align=center|22
| align="center" | finals
|align=center|
|align=center|
|align=center|
|-bgcolor=PowderBlue
|align=center|2018–19
|align=center|3rd "A"
|align=center|9/10
|align=center|27
|align=center|6
|align=center|7
|align=center|14
|align=center|20
|align=center|34
|align=center|25
| align="center" | finals
|align=center|
|align=center|
|align=center|
|-bgcolor=PowderBlue
| align="center" |2019–20
| align="center" |3rd "A"
| align="center" |6/11
| align="center" |20
| align="center" |8
| align="center" |5
| align="center" |7
| align="center" |23
| align="center" |25
| align="center" |29
| align="center" | finals
| align="center" |
| align="center" |
| align="center" |
|}

Dynamo 2009
{|class="wikitable"
|-bgcolor="#efefef"
! Season
! Div.
! Pos.
! Pl.
! W
! D
! L
! GS
! GA
! P
!Domestic Cup
!colspan=2|Europe
!Notes
|-
|align=center|Before 2008
|align=center colspan=13| refer to Podillya Khmelnytskyi
|-
|align=center|2008–09
|align=center rowspan=5|3rd "A"
|align=center|8
|align=center|32
|align=center|14
|align=center|5
|align=center|13
|align=center|32
|align=center|38
|align=center|47
|align=center|1/32 finals
|align=center|
|align=center|
|align=center|
|-
|align=center|2009–10
|align=center|5
|align=center|20
|align=center|10
|align=center|3
|align=center|7
|align=center|28
|align=center|16
|align=center|33
|align=center|1/64 finals
|align=center|
|align=center|
|align=center|
|-
|align=center|2010–11
|align=center|9
|align=center|22
|align=center|7
|align=center|4
|align=center|11
|align=center|19
|align=center|29
|align=center|22
|align=center|1/32 finals
|align=center|
|align=center|
|align=center|−3
|-
|align=center|2011–12
|align=center|10
|align=center|26
|align=center|6
|align=center|4
|align=center|16
|align=center|23
|align=center|50
|align=center|22
|align=center|1/64 finals
|align=center|
|align=center|
|align=center|
|-
|align=center rowspan="2"|2012–13
|align=center|10
|align=center|20 	
|align=center|4 		 	
|align=center|5 		 	 	
|align=center|11 				
|align=center|12 	  		 		  	
|align=center|22 		  	
|align=center|17
|align=center rowspan=2|1/32 finals
|align=center|
|align=center|
|align=center|
|-
|align=center|3rd "3"
|align=center|4
|align=center|6 			
|align=center|0 	 			
|align=center|1 		
|align=center|5 				
|align=center|1 	 			
|align=center|13 		
|align=center|1
|align=center|
|align=center|
|align=center|Relegation groups
|-
|align=center|2013–14
|align=center|3rd
|align=center|19
|align=center|36
|align=center|3
|align=center|2
|align=center|31
|align=center|18
|align=center|52
|align=center|11
|align=center|1/32 finals
|align=center|
|align=center|
|align=center bgcolor=red|Withdrew
|}

Managers
  Andriy Biba (1983)
  Viktor Matviyenko (1993)
  Myron Markevych (1995)
  Vitaliy Kvartsyanyi (1997–99)
  Bohdan Blavatskiy (2007–08)
  Yaroslav Bobylyak (2008)

See also
 FC Dynamo Khmelnytskyi (2009)

Notes

References

External links
  Official team website
 The 2021 club presentation (Свято футболу: Поділля у Першій лізі!). The Club's channel at YouTube. 24 July 2021
 Бейдерман: «Як і говорив – дійду до Лозанни!» . football.km.ua. 5 February 2020.

 
Association football clubs established in 1960
1960 establishments in Ukraine
Sport in Khmelnytskyi, Ukraine
Football clubs in Khmelnytskyi Oblast
Ukrainian First League clubs